The Forum at Fishers Ice Arena is an arena and recreational sport facility located in Fishers, Indiana. It features two NHL size sheets of ice for hockey, figure skating, and open skating. The Forum also features a fully equipped Pro Shop.

In 2012, The Forum was the home of the Indianapolis Enforcers of the Continental Indoor Football League; however, the team ceased operations after the 2012 season.

External links
Official Forum at Fishers website 

Indoor arenas in Indiana
Indoor ice hockey venues in the United States
Sports venues in Indiana
Ice hockey venues in Indiana